Ken Albala is Tully Knoles Endowed Professor of History at the University of the Pacific (United States). He has authored or edited 27 books on food and co-authored "The Lost Art of Real Cooking" and "The Lost Arts of Hearth and Home." Albala co-edited the journal "Food, Culture and Society" and has made numerous appearances in media and at conferences discussing food issues He is featured on the DVD: "Food: A Cultural Culinary History." and "Cooking Across the Ages." Albala is also known for his "Food Cultures Around the World" series for Greenwood Press and Rowman and Littlefield Studies in Food and Gastronomy.

Bibliography

Books

 Eating Right in the Renaissance, University of California Press, 2002.
 Food in Early Modern Europe, Greenwood Press, 2003.
 Opening Up North America, with Caroline Cox, Facts on File, 2005. Revised ed, 2009.
 Cooking in Europe: 1250-1650, Greenwood Press, 2006.
 The Banquet: Dining in the Great Courts of Late Renaissance Europe, U. of Illinois Press, 2007.
 Beans: A History, Berg Publishers, 2007.
 Pancake, Reaktion Press, 2008. Translated into Japanese 2013.
 The Lost Art of Real Cooking, with Rosanna Nafziger, Perigee/Penguin, 2010. 
 Three World Cuisines: Italian, Mexican, Chinese. AltaMira Press, 2012. 
 The Lost Arts of Hearth and Home, with Rosanna Nafziger, Perigee/Penguin, 2012. 
 Grow Food, Eat Food, Share Food. Oregon State University Press, 2013. 
 Nuts: A Global History. Reaktion Press, 2014. 
 The Most Excellent Book of Cookery: An edition and translation of the 16th century Livre fort excellent de cuysine. With Timothy Tomasik. Prospect Books, 2014. 
 Noodle Soup: Recipes, Techniques, Obsession. University of Illinois Press, 2018. 

Edited volumes and encyclopedias

 The Business of Food: Encyclopedia of the Food and Drink Industries. With Gary Allen. Greenwood Press, 2007.
 Human Cuisine. With Gary Allen. Thyestian Press/Booksurge, 2008. 
 Food Cultures of the World Encyclopedia. Four Volumes. Greenwood Press/ABC-CLIO, 2011. 
 Food and Faith in the Christian Tradition. With Trudy Eden. Columbia University Press, 2011. 
 A Cultural History of Food in The Renaissance. Fabio Parasecoli and Peter Scholliers, Series Editors. Ken Albala, vol. 3 editor. Berg Publishers, 2012. 
 Routledge International Handbook of Food Studies. Routledge, 2012. Paperback ed. 2014. 
 Food History: A Primary Source Reader. Bloomsbury, 2014. 
 From Famine to Fast Food: Nutrition, Diet and Concepts of Health Around the World. ABC-CLIO, 2014. 
 Food in Time and Place: The American Historical Association Companion to Food History. Paul Freedman, Joyce Chaplin and Ken Albala, editors. University of California Press, 2014. 
 Food Issues: An Encyclopedia. Three Volumes. Sage Publications, 2015. 
 At the Table: Food and Family Around the World. Greenwood/ABC-CLIO, 2016.

Awards

 "Three World Cuisines: Italian, Mexican, Chinese" was the winner of the Gourmand World Cookbook Award for “Best Foreign Cuisine Book in the World” 2013.
 "Beans" won the 2008 International Association of Culinary Professionals Jane Grigson Award and the Cordon d’Or in Food History/Literature.

References

1964 births
Living people
American food writers
University of the Pacific (United States) faculty
Food historians